Ruling Passion is a 1973 crime novel by Reginald Hill, the third novel in the Dalziel and Pascoe series.  The novel opens with Detective Peter Pascoe arriving at what should have been a reunion of old friends. Instead he walks in on the scene of a grisly triple-murder. To solve the crime, Pascoe needs both his superior officer, Andy Dalziel and his romantic partner—and Dalziel's feminist antagonist—Elli.

Publication history
1973, London: Collins Crime Club , Pub date April 1973, Hardback
1987, London: Harper Collins 
2008, New York: Felony & Mayhem Press , Pub date September 2008.

References 

1973 British novels
Novels by Reginald Hill
Collins Crime Club books